Mountain Falls Park is an unincorporated community in Frederick County, Virginia, United States. Mountain Falls Park is located on the eastern slope of the Great North Mountain to the east of the West Virginia border.

References

Unincorporated communities in Frederick County, Virginia
Unincorporated communities in Virginia